The Texelgruppe Nature Park is a nature reserve in South Tyrol, Italy. It has a total area of 33,430 hectares.

Geography 
It extends from Merano in the south to the Schnalstal in the west and the Passeier Valley to the east, while the Central Alpine Divide forms its northern border.

References

External links 

Texelgruppe